Unfinished Business is the 31st album by the American singer Wanda Jackson.

The album includes new material as well as cover versions of songs by singers and songwriters such as Townes Van Zandt, Etta James, Woody Guthrie and Bobby Womack/Shirley Womack.

The album draws upon her rockabilly and country roots and was produced by the Americana singer-songwriter Justin Townes Earle.

Track listing
"I'm Tore Down"
"The Graveyard Shift"
"Am I Even a Memory" (featuring Justin Townes Earle)
"Pushover"
"It's All Over Now"
"Two Hands"
"Old Weakness"
"What Do You Do When You're Lonesome"
"Down Past the Bottom"
"California Stars"

Personnel
Drums – Bryan Owings
Upright bass – Mike Bub
Electric piano, organ, piano – Skylar Wilson
Electric guitar, pedal steel – Paul Niehaus
Electric guitar – Kenny Vaughan
Harmonica on "Down Past The Bottom" – Cory Younts
Acoustic guitar on "California Stars" – Justin Townes Earle
Backup vocals – Cory Younts, Amanda Shires

Chart performance

References

2012 albums
Wanda Jackson albums
Sugar Hill Records albums
Albums produced by Justin Townes Earle